Nikolaos Frousos (Greek: Νικόλαος Φρούσος; born 29 April 1974) is a former Greek footballer who played for Cyprus giants Anorthosis Famagusta.

Career
Frousos' career began when he signed a professional contract with Ionikos, making his first first-team appearance in 1992 at the age of 18, transferred from Erani Filiatra. He stayed there for eight years where he scored 59 goals. In the summer of 2000 he moved to PAOK FC for three years, scoring 16 goals. The following year he moved back to Ionikos for a single season. In June 2004, he signed with the Cypriot giants Anorthosis Famagusta. During the four years he played for Anorthosis, he won two championships (2004–2005 & 2007–2008), and one cup (2006–2007). He is married and has 2 children, one girl, Katerina, and one boy, Apostolos.

External links
 

1974 births
Living people
Greek footballers
Greece international footballers
Association football forwards
PAOK FC players
Ionikos F.C. players
Anorthosis Famagusta F.C. players
Super League Greece players
Cypriot First Division players
Expatriate footballers in Cyprus
People from Filiatra
Footballers from the Peloponnese